Phoenix roebelenii, with common names of dwarf date palm, pygmy date palm, miniature date palm or robellini palm, is a species of date palm native to southeastern Asia, from southwestern China (Yunnan Province), northern Laos and northern Vietnam, (in Dien Bien Province, Ha Giang Province, Cao Bang Province, Lang Son Province). 

The Latin specific epithet roebelenii honours the orchid collector Carl Roebelen (1855–1927).

Description

The flowers are small, yellowish, produced on a  inflorescence. The fruit is an edible 1 cm drupe resembling a small, thin-fleshed date.

This Palm produces strong, spiny thorns approx. 2-4" in length. The size of the thorns depends on the age of the tree.  These thorns are located on the Palm Leaf stem close to the truck and can may extend 6-12" from the trunk.  The thorns are very sharp and easily penetrate the skin.  They are poisonous and can cause irritation, skin infection, bruising and can be severe.  They can also cause an allergic reaction. These reactions differentiate on the exposure.

Cultivation and uses
Phoenix roebelenii is a popular ornamental plant in gardens in tropical and subtropical  climate areas. With a minimum temperature requirement of  it is grown under glass or as a houseplant in cooler areas. It needs little pruning to develop a strong structure, is resistant to pests, is tolerant to soil variation, and is moderately drought tolerant. The plant grows in partial shade to full sun, with the local climate determining where to plant.

This plant has gained the Royal Horticultural Society's Award of Garden Merit.

The NASA Clean Air Study concluded that this was a plant that was effective at removing common household air toxins formaldehyde and benzene.

Gallery

References

External links

roebelenii
Trees of China
Trees of Laos
Trees of Vietnam
Garden plants
Garden plants of Asia
House plants
Ornamental trees